Vikrampur Village is a town and a Panchayat in Dewas district in the Indian state of Madhya Pradesh. Vikrampur Village is a major agricultural production area in Madhya Pradesh. Earlier. India census,

References 

Villages in Dewas district